Out of the Blue is the debut studio album by American singer-songwriter Debbie Gibson, released on August 18, 1987 by Atlantic Records. The album received favorable reviews from music critics and sold more than three million copies in the United States (three times platinum by RIAA) and five million copies worldwide.

Background
Gibson personally wrote all ten songs on this album. As executive producer, Douglas Breitbart of Broadbeard Productions, Inc. (whom Gibson's mother had hired as manager five years before), assembled a team of producers from both New York and Florida:  Fred Zarr, John Morales, Sergio Munzibai and Lewis A. Martineé.

Zarr produced "Shake Your Love" and "Fallen Angel" in addition to "Only in My Dreams," and co-produced "Out of the Blue," "Staying Together" and "Wake Up to Love" with Gibson, sole producer for "Foolish Beat."  Morales and Munzibai produced "Red Hot" and "Between the Lines."  Martineé produced "Play the Field".

While posing for the album cover, Gibson was told by the photographer that her knee was pulling focus; as a compromise, the makeup artist drew a face on her knee. This became a fashion trend among girls who attended her concerts.

Out of the Blue made No. 7 on the U.S. Billboard 200 chart and No. 26 on the UK Albums Chart. The album sold over three million copies in the United States, and five million copies worldwide.

Reissues
Out of the Blue was included in the 2017 box set We Could Be Together, with six remixes as bonus tracks.

A special four-disc digipack edition was released by Cherry Red Records on October 15, 2021. This release includes two remix CDs and a DVD containing the album's five music videos, the live video Live in Concert: The "Out of the Blue" Tour, and a special interview video.

Track listing

Personnel
Musicians

Deborah Gibson – lead and backing vocals, rhythm programs, keyboard, synthesizer, additional keyboards
Fred Zarr – rhythm programs, keyboards, synthesizer, additional keyboards (tracks 1–4, 6–8)
John Morales – programming, sequencing (tracks 5, 10)
David "Jaz" Grant – keyboard overdubs, guitar (tracks 5, 7–8, 10)
Lewis A. Martineé – rhythm programs, keyboards, backing vocals (track 9)
Mike Baskt – keyboards (track 9)
Ira Siegel – guitar, acoustic guitar, electric guitar (tracks 1–4)
Tommy Williams – guitar, electric guitar (tracks 1, 6)
Nestor Gomez – guitar (track 9)
Gary Down – bass (track 3)
Bashiri Johnson – percussion (tracks 1–4, 6–8)
Billy Amendola – Tom Tom overdubs (track 3)
Jimmy Maelen – percussion overdubs (tracks 5, 10)
Jeff Smith – saxophone, saxophone overdubs, backing vocals (tracks 2–8, 10)
LaRita Gaskins – backing vocals (tracks 1–3, 6)
Carrie Johnson – backing vocals (tracks 1–2, 4, 6–8)
Libby Johnson – backing vocals (tracks 1–2, 6–8)
Norma Jean Wright – backing vocals (track 3)
Tim Lawless – backing vocals (track 4)
Connie Harvey – backing vocals (tracks 5, 10)
Janet Wright – backing vocals (tracks 5, 10)
Wendell Morrison – backing vocals (tracks 5, 10)
Haydee – backing vocals (track 9)

Production

Debbie Gibson – arranger (tracks 1–4, 6–8)
Fred Zarr – arranger, mixing (tracks 1–4, 6–8)
John Morales – arranger, mix engineer (tracks 5, 10)
Sergio Munzibai – arranger (track 5)
Lewis A. Martineé – arranger, engineer (track 9)
Don Feinberg – recording engineer (tracks 1–4, 6–8)
Bernard Bullock – recording engineer (tracks 1–4, 6–8)
Phil Castellano – recording engineer, mixing (tracks 1–4, 6–8)
Peter Sturge – recording engineer (tracks 5, 10)
Billy Esses – assistant engineer (tracks 1–4, 6–8)
Jim Goatley – assistant mix engineer (tracks 1–2, 4, 6–8)
Carlos Santos – assistant (track 9)
Michael Hutchinson – mixing (tracks 2, 6)
"Little" Louie Vega – mixing (track 3)
Doc Dougherty – mixing (track 3)
Douglas Breitbart – executive producer, management (Broadbeard Productions, Inc.)
Greg Porto – art direction
Adrian Buckmaster – photography
Howie Weinberg – mastering (Masterdisk)

Charts

Weekly charts

Year-end charts

Certifications and sales

References

External links
 
 
 

1987 debut albums
Out of the Blue
Atlantic Records albums